(born May 7, 1999 in Sapporo, Hokkaido) is a Japanese pop singer. She is a former tenth-generation member of the pop group Morning Musume.

Early life 
Masaki Satō was born on May 7, 1999 in Hokkaido, Japan.

Career

2011–present: Debut with Morning Musume 
On September 29, 2011, at a concert at Nippon Budokan, which was part of Morning Musume Concert Tour 2011 Aki Ai Believe: Takahashi Ai Sotsugyō Kinen Special, it was announced that Masaki Satō passed the auditions alongside three other girls: Haruna Īkubo, Ayumi Ishida and Haruka Kudō, and would join Morning Musume.

On October 10, 2012, it was announced that Satō would be a member of the new unit, Harvest, alongside Erina Ikuta , Ayumi Ishida and Akari Takeuchi.

On July 23, 2013,  it was announced that Satō would be a member of the new unit, Jurin, alongside Juice=Juice member Karin Miyamoto.

On March 13, 2014, it was announced that Satō would be a member of a newly formed Satoyama movement unit, Sato no Akari, alongside Rina Katsuta, and Akari Uemura.

She graduated from Morning Musume on December 13, 2021, in order to become a soloist.

Discography
For Masaki Satō's releases with Morning Musume, see Morning Musume discography.

Singles

Bibliography

Photobooks
 (October 6, 2018, Odyssey Books and Wani Books)

Filmography

Television 
 (NTV, 2012)

Notes

References 

Japanese women pop singers
Living people
Morning Musume members
Japanese female idols
1999 births
Musicians from Sapporo